René García (born July 10, 1974) is a Republican politician from Florida. He has served on the Miami-Dade County Commission since 2020, representing the Hialeah area. He previously served in the Florida House of Representatives from 2000 to 2008 and in the Florida Senate from 2010 to 2018.

History
García was born in Hialeah and attended Miami-Dade Community College, where he graduated with an Associate degree in 1996. Afterwards, he attended Florida International University, where he received a degree in political science in 1999. García then graduated from the University of Miami with a Master of Business Administration in health care administration in 2004. In 1995, while still in college, he ran for a position on the Hialeah City Council, but he received only 2% of the vote. Two years later, he ran again, and this time won with 18% of the vote. García was re-elected to his position in 1999.

Florida House of Representatives
In 2000, when incumbent State Representative Rudy García ran for the Florida Senate, which resulted in an open seat. René García ran to succeed Rudy García, and defeated Andy Pérez in the Republican primary with 55% of the vote. He was re-elected without opposition in 2002, 2004, and 2006, and could not seek another term in 2008 due to term limits.

Florida Senate
When Rudy García could not run for the Senate again due to term limits, René García once again ran to succeed him. He faced no opposition in the primary or the general election, and thus won his first term in the 40th District unopposed. When Florida Senate districts were redrawn in 2012, García was redistricted into the 38th District, which included most of the territory that he had previously represented. Once again, he was elected unopposed.

While serving in the Senate, García joined with State Representative Michael Bileca to sponsor legislation that prevented state and local governments in Florida from doing business with companies that were connected to Cuba. When the Florida Chamber of Commerce opposed the legislation, Garcia blasted them, calling their opposition "an abomination to the very fabric of our state and country." The law was later struck down, however, by the United States Court of Appeals for the Eleventh Circuit, which said that it "reaches far beyond federal law in numerous ways and undermines the president's exercise of the discretion afford him by Congress." Additionally, García joined with State Representative Manny Diaz, Jr. to sponsor legislation that would ban Cuban-trained doctors from practicing in Florida, noting, "The Fidel Castro medical scholarship program is purely a propaganda tool. Hopefully this legislation will stop American citizens from participating in Cuba's medical apartheid program."

García worked with Democratic State Senator Dwight Bullard to continue subsidizing private tutoring companies in Florida, an effort that ultimately failed. Speaking in defense of their proposal, García asserted, "What we're trying to do is keep it in law that the students have the option of tutoring services, both public and private. At the end of the day, the ones who benefit from this are minority students." García also joined Democrats in the Senate to defeat the controversial "parent trigger" legislation, which "would have allowed parents with students at F-rated schools to petition their school board to select one of the state's mandated turnaround options--which include converting it to a charter school."

During the 2011 Legislative Session, Senator García passed various pieces of legislation. The first was SB514/HB 347 Vehicle Crashes Involving Death. This bill was done in memory of Ashley Nicole Valdés who was struck and killed by a vehicle on January 8, 2009. The driver of the vehicle which struck Ashley never stopped and was arrested 8 days later only because he had taken the vehicle to get repairs done. Crime Stoppers were notified by the shop owner after realizing the truck matched the description of the vehicle police were looking for. Soon after the driver was apprehended, but only spent 2 hours in jail before he was able to post bond. The criminal case against the driver who struck down Ashley in 2009 was tried in 2011. This legislation creates new penalties for those drivers involved in car crashes which result in death and speed away instead of stopping at the scene of the accident. A person arrested for fleeing the scene of an accident will be charged with a felony of the first degree. Those who have been previously convicted of leaving the scene of an accident, racing on highways, driving under the influence (DUI) or felony driving while having a license suspended, revoked, canceled, or disqualified must be held in custody until first appearance before a judge for a bail determination. If the accident occurs while the driver is under the influence, they shall be sentenced to a mandatory minimum term of imprisonment of 2 years. This legislation change gives judges the flexibility in setting the proper bond amounts.

A second bill passed into law during the 2011 Legislative Session was CS/SB 1922/ CS/HB 1125 Health and Human Services. During the 2008 Florida Legislative session, Senator García played an integral part in the creation of the company Florida Health Choices. This organization was set up to establish a voluntary marketplace in which insurance and health care vendors, insurance agents, employers and their employees could do business. It is a web-based shopping experience that will provide easy access and side-by-side comparison of products and services. The program will assist small employers with compliance of all rules and regulations.

The goal of the bill was to make it easier and more cost effective for individuals to purchase health insurance. Senator García filed this bill in order to make the appropriate changes needed to streamline the process, remove redundancies, conform to the insurance code and permit alignment with common insurance industry practices.

The third bill passed during the legislative session of 2011 was SB 880/HB 281 Value Adjustment Boards. This legislation deals with cash strapped school districts, cities, and counties in obtaining greater funding during difficult economic times. Property owners who disagree with their property’s assessed value would be able to continue appealing to their county’s value adjustment board (VAB). There would just be needed changes to ensure that the process be done equally and beneficial to all citizens of the counties they reside in. 

During the 2012 Legislative Session the following bills were filed and passed into law. The first was SJR 1740/HJR 169 Homestead Exemption for Seniors. This joint resolution proposed an amendment to the Florida Constitution allowing for counties and local governments to provide certain low income seniors with the opportunity to be exempted from paying their property taxes. To qualify for the additional homestead tax exemption, a senior has to be 65 years old or older, have lived in their residence for at least 25 years, have an annual income of no more than $27,030 and the property must have a value of less than $250,000.00. This amendment was approved by the voters in 2012.

Another bill passed during the 2012 legislative session was CS/SB 1144/ CS/HB 959 State and Local Government Relations with Cuba or Syria. This bill creates a prohibition against contracting with companies that have business operations in Cuba or Syria. It prohibits a company with business operations in Cuba or Syria from bidding on, submitting a proposal for, or entering into or renewing a contract with an agency or local governmental entity for goods or services of $1 million or more. Beginning July 1, 2012. The law prohibits the State Board of Administration from investing in either country or companies that do business with Cuba or Syria. In 2013 the courts ruled against this legislation explaining that individual states do not have the power to determine the foreign policy of the United States as a whole.

In protecting the drinking water of Miami Dade County as well as promoting the preservation of the Everglades, Senator Garcia passed CS/CS/SB 182/ HB 377 Miami-Dade Lake Belt Mitigation Plan. This bill transfers, for a limited time, the proceeds of the Lake Belt water treatment upgrade fee from Miami-Dade County to the South Florida Water Management District to pay for seepage mitigation projects. 

Senator García and then-incoming Senate President Don Gaetz passed CS/CS/CS SB 1568. This bill set up new requirements as to the steps needed to take when a public hospital is going to be sold or leased. Some of the new requirements included requiring any sale or lease of a public hospital that is owned by a county, district, or municipality to be approved by the Chief Financial Officer (CFO) of Florida.

During the 2013 Legislative Session Senator Garcia worked in stopping two pieces of legislation. CS/CS/SB 306 Economic Development or better known as the Miami Dolphins Stadium Bill would have created the Sports Development program. This program would have allowed applicants to apply to the Department of Economic Opportunity (DEO) for funding to assist in the construction, reconstruction, renovation, or improvement of a sports facility.

The senator had many concerns with the Dolphins bill since it was filed for the 2013 Legislative Session. There was a lot of information being discussed regarding how good or bad the passage of this bill would be.  Unfortunately the more information the senator reviewed and the more he spoke to people knowledgeable on the sports stadium funding process, the more skeptical he became and the greater his worries were. His biggest concern with this bill was that both the State and Local governments were going to hand over a total of over $300 million of tax payer money to fund a renovation project for a private entity who could afford to pay for renovations on their own.

The second concern with this bill is that as it moved through the legislative process in the Senate it kept changing. By the time the bill was heard and voted upon on the Senate floor it had been loaded up with other sports projects from the rest of the state which also would have been allowed to apply for state funding. Senator Garcia was only one of four senators who voted against the Dolphins bill. He saw it as a personal insult to the people of Florida who entrust the legislature in Tallahassee to use our limited tax dollars in the most efficient manner.

A second bill Senator García was also against was CS/CS/HB 867 Parent Empowerment in Education which is better known as the Parent Trigger Bill. This bill would have enabled parents, through a petition process to the school district, to request the implementation of a parent-selected turnaround option for low performing schools. The turnaround option most likely being to convert the public school into a charter school. Assuming the petition was signed by a majority of the parents of students currently enrolled in the school and/or students who would be in the following school year, the district school board would have to hold a meeting to decide whether or not to accept the parents option or choose another course of action to improve the low performing school. If the district school board did not adopt the parent-selected option, it must include that option with the implementation plan submitted to the State Board of Education. The State Board of Education would have the final say as to whether or not a county school board would have to implement the parent-selected option or their own option.

Senator García spoke with various educators throughout the district and heard from concerned parents throughout all of Florida. They were opposed to this bill. He was in agreement with the supporters of the bill that the Florida education system needs some much needed reforms. He disagreed with them over their process to find a solution.

During the 2013 Legislative Session, the Florida House stopped the State of Florida from receiving billions of dollars to expand Medicaid. The Florida Senate President formed the Select Committee on PPACA to study Medicaid. The Senate came up with a Florida-based alternative to expansion of the current Medicaid program. It was called the Healthy Florida. The proposed program would have used available federal tax dollars to fund premium assistance for uninsured Floridians to purchase private health insurance. There had been concerns in both the Senate and the House about adding an estimated one million new enrollees to the current Medicaid system during a critical stage of implementation for the statewide Medicaid managed care reforms passed by the Legislature in 2011 and also about the cost to the state after the first three years the Federal Government promised to pay 100% of the Medicaid costs.

The Senate’s Healthy Florida plan centered on private insurance options and personal responsibility. It included the proper benchmarks to ensure the state of Florida is protected if Washington fails to send the federal tax dollars of Floridians back to the state to fund this premium assistance for the uninsured. The Healthy Florida plan would have used available federal funding to assist individuals and families with purchasing private insurance coverage.  The program would be operated separately from Florida’s current Medicaid program by building on the successful framework of Florida Healthy Kids. Under the Senates Healthy Florida plan, enrollees would be provided a choice of plans and options to select individual or family coverage. All plans would have also required that a health reimbursement account (HRA) or comparable health savings account be established for Healthy Florida enrollees to encourage and incentivize healthy behaviors.

Miami-Dade County Commissioner
Garcia ran for the open commission seat being vacated by Esteban Bovo who is term-limited and running for Dade County Mayor. Garcia ran in the nonpartisan primary against Adrian Jimenez beating his opponent with 77%, because Garcia won overwhelmingly in the primary a runoff was not needed and took office in November.

References

External links
Florida House of Representatives - Rene Garcia

|-

|-

|-

|-

Living people
1974 births
People from Hialeah, Florida
Miami Dade College alumni
Florida International University alumni
University of Miami Business School alumni
Florida city council members
Republican Party members of the Florida House of Representatives
Republican Party Florida state senators
American politicians of Cuban descent
21st-century American politicians
Hispanic and Latino American state legislators in Florida